Enzo Jacques Rodolphe Ebosse (born 11 March 1999) is a professional footballer who plays as a defender for  club Udinese. Born in France, he represents Cameroon at international level.

Club career
On 23 August 2016, Ebosse made his professional debut for Lens in the Coupe de la Ligue against Paris FC. He made his league debut for RC Lens in a 2–0 Ligue 2 loss to US Orléans on 28 August 2017.

Ebosse joined Le Mans, newly promoted to Ligue 2, in 2019.

On 16 July 2020, Ebosse joined Angers SCO. He signed a three-year contract at the club.

On 29 July 2022, Ebosse signed a five-year contract with Udinese in Italy.

International career
Ebosse was born in Amiens, France, and is of Cameroonian descent. He debuted with the Cameroon national team in a friendly 2–0 loss to Uzbekistan on 23 September 2022.

Honours 
Cameroon
 Africa Cup of Nations: Third place 2021

References

External links

1999 births
Living people
Sportspeople from Amiens
Footballers from Hauts-de-France
Association football defenders
Cameroonian footballers
Cameroon international footballers
French footballers
France youth international footballers
French sportspeople of Cameroonian descent
2021 Africa Cup of Nations players
2022 FIFA World Cup players
Amiens SC players
RC Lens players
Le Mans FC players
Angers SCO players
Udinese Calcio players
Ligue 1 players
Ligue 2 players
Championnat National 2 players
Championnat National 3 players
Serie A players
French expatriate footballers
Cameroonian expatriate footballers
Expatriate footballers in Italy
French expatriate sportspeople in Italy
Cameroonian expatriate sportspeople in Italy